Prasain or Prasai is a surname belonging to the Khas people of both the Brahmin and Chhetri caste from Nepal.

Notable people with the surname Prasain include:
Deepika Prasain, Nepalese movie and theater actress
Ganga_Prasad_Prasain, Indian politician
Bishnu Prasad Prasain,  Nepali politician
Khanuparude (Rambabu Prasai), Nepali politician
Nanda Kumar Prasai, Nepali politician                         * Hum Kumar Prasai , Nepali politician

References

Ethnic groups in Nepal
Nepali-language surnames
Khas surnames
Kshatriya communities
Brahmin communities